Sherkat-e Neka Chub (also Romanized as Sherkat-e Nekā Chūb) is a village in Miandorud-e Bozorg Rural District, in the Central District of Miandorud County, Mazandaran Province, Iran. At the 2006 census, its population was 363, in 91 families.

References 

Populated places in Miandorud County